Kajiji Airport  is an airport serving Kajiji in Bandundu Province, Democratic Republic of the Congo. The airport and village are on a mesa with dropoffs to the west and south.

See also

 Transport in the Democratic Republic of the Congo
 List of airports in the Democratic Republic of the Congo

References

External links
 FallingRain - Kajiji Airport
 HERE Maps - Kajiji
 OpenStreetMap - Kajiji
 OurAirports - Kajiji Airport
 

Airports in Kwango